Itaconic anhydride is the cyclic anhydride of itaconic acid (an unsaturated, dicarboxylic acid) and is obtained by the pyrolysis of citric acid. It is a colourless, crystalline solid, which dissolves in many polar organic solvents and hydrolyzes forming itaconic acid. Itaconic anhydride and its derivative itaconic acid have been promoted as biobased "platform chemicals" and bio- building blocks.) These expectations, however, have not been fulfilled.

Production 
As discovered as early as 1836, attempted distillation of citric acid gives the so-called "pyrocitric acid" ("Brenzcitronensäure"), now known as itaconic anhydride.

According to an organic synthesis protocol, itaconic anhydride is obtained from the rapid heating of citric acid monohydrate in a modest yield (37-47 %). The by-product is the thermodynamically more stable citraconic anhydride.

Also when heating anhydrous citric acid to 260 °C in a vacuum, a mixture of itaconic and citraconic anhydride is achieved "in good yield".

More productive are processes based on the biotechnologically accessible itaconic acid, which produces exclusively itaconic anhydride in yields of up to 98% at temperatures of 165-180 °C and pressures of 10-30 mmHg in the presence of catalytic quantities of strong acids, such as concentrated sulphuric acid.

In order to avoid overheating and thus higher proportions of citraconic anhydride, the dehydration reaction can also be carried out in higher boiling aromatic solvents such as toluene or xylene in the presence of acidic montmorillonite or in cumene in the presence of methanesulfonic acid. In both variants yields of 95-97 % of itaconic anhydride are achieved.

Another process of cyclizing dicarboxylic acids with diethyl carbonate in the presence of a chromium-salen complex with µ-nitrido-bis(triphenylphosphane) chloride as cocatalyst quantitatively provides itaconic anhydride contaminated with citraconic anhydride already at 40 °C in 1 millimolar preparations. However, the reaction is technically uninteresting because of its expensive catalysts.

Reactions 
At temperatures above its melting point, itaconic anhydride converts to citraconic anhydride. Even at significantly lower temperatures, such as in boiling chloroform, isomerization can take place in the presence of tertiary amines.

By treating itaconic anhydride with phosphorus pentachloride (PCl5), itaconic acid dichloride (itaconyl chloride) is obtained:

from which polyamides with reactive vinylidene groups can be formed with diamines.

Bromination of itaconic anhydride at – 20 °C and subsequent dehydrobromination produces 2-bromomethylmaleic anhydride in 70% yield by shifting the double bond into the five-membered ring.

Otto Diels and Kurt Alder already described the addition (Diels-Alder reaction) of the dienophile itaconic anhydride to the diene cyclopentadiene in 1928. Also furfuryl alcohol, which is accessible from renewable raw materials, reacts as a diene to form the Diels-Alder adduct, in which the reaction of the alcohol group with the cyclic anhydride structure forms a lactone and a carboxylic acid group, i.e. the cyclic half ester of itaconic acid.

Itaconic anhydride can react with aromatics such as benzene via Friedel-Crafts acylation. This always happens in such a way that the ring opening occurs at the carbonyl group, which is further away from the methylene group (3-position).

Nucleophiles such as thiols can easily be added to the methylene group. With other nucleophiles, such as alcohols, ammonia, amines and hydroxylamine, itaconic anhydride reacts regioselectively in position 3 to the corresponding esters, amides and hydroxamic acids.

The hydroxamic acid formed with O-benzylhydroxylamine can be cyclized in high yields with dicyclohexylcarbodiimide (DCC) to five-membered isoimides (iminofuranones) or with acetanhydride (Ac2O) to imides.

A number of five-, six- and seven-membered heterocycles (such as benzothiazepines) are obtainable from itaconic anhydride in useful yields.

Polymers of itaconic anhydride 
As an unsaturated cyclic anhydride, itaconic anhydride undergoes radical polymerization and via polycondensation with diols or diamines. The two reactions can also be carried out sequentially – first radical polymerization, then polycondensation or vice versa.

Radically produced itaconic anhydride polymers and copolymers can be alkaline hydrolyzed to polyitaconic acids under ring opening or converted into polymeric acid amides or esters subsequent to polymerization.

The resulting copolymers show properties that suggest a potential use as biomaterials for therapeutic systems and prostheses.

Functional polymers exclusively from biogenic monomers involves the ring-opening metathesis polymerisation of an oxanorbornene ester produced from itaconic anhydride and furfuryl alcohol by Diels-Alder lactonisation using a Grubbs II catalyst.

References 

Carboxylic anhydrides